Point Leo is a rural surfing locality on the Mornington Peninsula in Melbourne, Victoria, Australia,  south-east of Melbourne's Central Business District, located within the Shire of Mornington Peninsula local government area. Point Leo recorded a population of 178 at the 2021 census.

Point Leo Foreshore Reserve provides excellent waves for surfing and is one of the closest surf beaches to Melbourne.

History

The area was known as Bobbanaring to the local Bunurong people prior to European settlement. The area was first surveyed in 1841, and a town was proposed here in 1869, but the area did not develop until after World War II, when the Woods family built a house and store. Facilities were developed in the 1960s, including camping grounds, toilet blocks with hot showers on the foreshore and a kiosk on the surf beach. A Post Office opened on 8 December 1969, but closed in 1974. By the 1980s the area was still dominated by holiday homes and weekend travellers with few permanent residents.

Present day

The small town contains a general store and supports an active surf lifesaving club and boat club. A large foreshore reserve includes picnic, barbecue and camping areas, managed by Point Leo Foreshore, and provide access to the surf beach. A gate fee is payable. Most other facilities are available from nearby Shoreham and Balnarring.

No public transport services Point Leo directly although the bus route 782 operated by Ventura Bus Lines between Frankston and Flinders passes within 2 km of the town.

See also
 Shire of Hastings – Point Leo was previously within this former local government area.

References

External links
 Point Leo Foreshore

Towns in Victoria (Australia)
Mornington Peninsula
Western Port
Coastal towns in Victoria (Australia)